The 2015 Asian Youth Athletics Championships was the first edition of the biennial, continental athletics competition for Asian athletes aged fifteen to seventeen. It was held in Doha, Qatar from 8–11 May. A total of forty events were contested, with the events divided evenly between the sexes. The event programme mirrored that of the previous IAAF World Youth Championships in Athletics, with the exception of a boy's decathlon, rather than the octathlon.

The event was established following the 78th council meeting of the Asian Athletics Association in March 2014. The body's president Dahlan Jumaan al-Hamad cited the creation of the championships as a way of boosting the grassroots-level development of the sport in Asia and raise the importance of continental level competition among the region's countries.

China easily topped the medal table with half of their 32 medals being gold. Chinese Taipei won the next most gold medals, with four, while India had the second largest overall medal haul at fourteen medals. Kazakhstan (three golds, eight medals) and Japan (nine medals) were the other leading nations of the tournament. A total of 27 of the participating nations reached the medal table.

Yu Shu Shen of Chinese Taipei was the only athlete to win two individual titles, doing so in the boys' 100 metres and 200 metres.

An anti-doping outreach and sports ethics programme was held in conjunction with the competition, with the achievements of Liu Xiang and Koji Murofushi being held up as examples of Olympic champions from Asia who promoted an anti-doping culture.

Medal summary

Men

Women

Medal table
Key

See also
2015 World Youth Championships in Athletics
2015 African Youth Athletics Championships

References

External links
Official website
Results book

Asian Youth Athletics Championships
Asian Youth Athletics Championships
International athletics competitions hosted by Qatar
Sports competitions in Doha
Asian Youth Athletics Championships
Asian Youth Athletics Championships
2015 in youth sport